1986 JSL Cup Final was the 11th final of the JSL Cup competition. The final was played at Nagoya Mizuho Athletics Stadium in Aichi on July 13th, 1986. Furukawa Electric won the championship.

Overview
Furukawa Electric won their 3rd title, by defeating Nissan Motors 4–0.

Match details

See also
1986 JSL Cup

References

JSL Cup
1986 in Japanese football
JEF United Chiba matches
Yokohama F. Marinos matches